Bučečovci is a village in the Municipality of Križevci in northeastern Slovenia. The area is part of the traditional region of Styria. It is now included with the rest of the municipality in the Mura Statistical Region.

A small Neo-Gothic chapel in the settlement was built in 1890.

References

External links
Bučečovci on Geopedia

Populated places in the Municipality of Križevci